Leucanopsis acuta is a moth of the family Erebidae. It was described by George Hampson in 1901. It is found in Brazil.

References

 

acuta
Moths described in 1901